Melanoplus clypeatus, known generally as shield-tailed grasshopper, is a species of spur-throated grasshopper in the family Acrididae. Other common names include the shield-tailed spur-throat grasshopper and shield-tailed locust. It is found in North America.

References

Melanoplinae
Articles created by Qbugbot
Insects described in 1877